Opheliidae is a family of small, annelid worms. Some of the genera, like Armandia, Ophelina and Polyophthalmus, have lost their circular muscles. The family consist of the following genera:
Ammotrypanella
Antiobactrum
Armandia
Dindymenides
Euzonus
Kesun
Lobochesis
Ophelia
Ophelina
Polyophthalmus
Pygophelia
Tachytrypane
Thoracophelia
Travisia

References

Polychaetes
Annelid families